The 2020 Lindsey Wilson Blue Raiders football team was an American football team that represented Lindsey Wilson College as a member of the Mid-South Conference during the 2020 NAIA football season. Due to the COVID-19 pandemic, the 2020 season was delayed until the winter and spring of 2021.

Schedule

References

Lindsey Wilson
Lindsey Wilson Blue Raiders football seasons
NAIA Football National Champions
College football undefeated seasons
Lindsey Wilson Blue Raiders football